The Roman Catholic Bishop of Honolulu is the diocesan bishop of the Catholic Diocese of Honolulu in the United States, the Latin Church ecclesiastical territory over the entire state of Hawaii and the unincorporated Hawaiian Islands.  The Honolulu diocese is a suffragan see in the ecclesiastical province administered by the metropolitan Archbishop of San Francisco.  The Bishop of Honolulu is a member of the United States Conference of Catholic Bishops.  He has two ecclesiastical seats: the Cathedral of Our Lady of Peace and the Co-Cathedral of Saint Theresa of the Child Jesus, both located in the City of Honolulu.

Previous to the canonical election of the Diocese of Honolulu, a single priest led what was the Prefecture Apostolic of the Sandwich Islands.  The prefecture apostolic was later incorporated into another ecclesiastical territory, led by a bishop serving as Vicariate Apostolic of Oriental Oceania.  The prefecture was later elevated to a vicariate apostolic.  The phrase "Sandwich Islands" was later deleted and replaced by "Hawaiian Islands".  Five bishops have led the Vicariate Apostolic of the Hawaiian Islands.  All bishops were members of the Congregation of the Sacred Hearts of Jesus and Mary.

Five diocesan bishops have served the Diocese of Honolulu.  On May 17, 2005 Pope Benedict XVI appointed the fifth bishop of Honolulu Msgr. Clarence Silva, who was consecrated and installed on July 21, 2005.

Church organization

Under civil laws, the Bishop of Honolulu acts as president of the Roman Catholic Church in Hawaii as corporation sole. He oversees several agencies and departments that include but are not limited to: Augustine Educational Foundation, Catholic Campus Ministry, Catholic Charities, Department of Religious Education, Ethnic Ministry, Office of Worship, Eastern Catholic Vicariate, Saint Stephen Diocesan Center, Social Ministry, Diocesan Tribunal.  He is also the publisher of the Hawai‘i Catholic Herald newspaper.

Efficient administration necessitated the creation of several vicariates served by vicars forane directly subordinate to the Bishop of Honolulu.  The vicariates forane are: West Honolulu Vicariate, East Honolulu Vicariate, Windward O‘ahu Vicariate, Leeward O‘ahu Vicariate, Maui Vicariate, West Hawai‘i Vicariate, East Hawai‘i Vicariate and Kaua‘i Vicariate.  A separate vicariate was created for ethnic communities and persons belonging to any of the Eastern Catholic Churches.  Within each vicariate are the individual parish churches, each led by pastors.

Interment
All those who served as Vicar Apostolic of the Hawaiian Islands or Bishop of Honolulu are buried in the Honolulu Catholic Cemetery, with the exception of Bishop Louis Maigret, Bishop James Sweeney, Bishop John Joseph Scanlan and Bishop Joseph Anthony Ferrario.  Bishops Maigret and Scanlan were buried in the crypt of the Cathedral of Our Lady of Peace.  Bishop Sweeney was buried in his family crypt in Holy Cross Cemetery in Colma, California.  The location of the remains of the Vicar Apostolic of Oriental Oceania, Bishop Etienne Jerome Rouchouze are unknown.  He is believed to have died at sea in a shipwreck. The remains of the only Prefect Apostolic of the Sandwich Islands, Msgr. Alexis Bachelot, SS.CC. are believed to be buried on Naha in the Marshall Islands.

Prelates
Prelates are listed below with their terms of service and titles held while in Hawaii. Msgr. Alexis Bachelot lead the Prefecture Apostolic of the Sandwich Islands.

See also

 Catholic Church by country
 Catholic Church hierarchy
 Catholic Church in the United States
 Ecclesiastical Province of San Francisco
 Global organisation of the Catholic Church
 Historical list of the Catholic bishops of the United States
 List of Catholic bishops of the United States
 List of missionaries to Hawaii
 List of Roman Catholic archdioceses (by country and continent)
 List of Roman Catholic dioceses (alphabetical) (including archdioceses)
 List of Roman Catholic dioceses (structured view) (including archdioceses)
 List of the Catholic dioceses of the United States
 Lists of patriarchs, archbishops, and bishops

Resources
 Roman Catholic Diocese of Honolulu
 Cathedral of Our Lady of Peace 
 Co-Cathedral of Saint Theresa of the Child Jesus
New Advent Article of the Vicariate Apostolic of the Sandwich Islands